Léandre is both a given name and a surname. Notable people with the name include:

Given name
Antoine Léandre Sardou (1803–1881), French philologist
Didier Léandre Tsiajotso, Malagasy politician
Léandre Dumouchel (1811–1882), Quebec doctor and political figure
Léandre Griffit (born 1984), French professional footballer
Léandre Lacroix (1859–1935), Luxembourgian politician and jurist
Léandre Thibault (1899–1971), Liberal party member of the Canadian House of Commons
Pierre-Léandre Marcotte (1837–1899), farmer and political figure in Quebec

Surname
Charles Lucien Léandre (1862–1934), French caricaturist and painter
Joëlle Léandre (born 1951), double bassist, vocalist, and composer
Léon Compère-Léandre (1874–1936), shoemaker in Saint-Pierre on the French Caribbean island of Martinique

See also
Hero and Leander, Greek myth
Saint Leander of Seville, Catholic Bishop of Seville
Saint-Léandre, Quebec, parish municipality in the Canadian province of Quebec
Leander (disambiguation)
Leandro (given name)
Leandra